The Xu Guangqi Memorial Hall (徐光启纪念馆) is a memorial and museum for the 17th-century Chinese scholar Xu Guangqi. It is located besides the tomb of Xu Guangqi in Guangqi Park (光启公园), Xujiahui, Xuhui District, Shanghai, China. Formerly Nandan Park (南丹公园), the park was renamed in 1983 for the 350th anniversary of Xu Guangqi's death.

References

Gallery

Xu Guangqi
Museums with year of establishment missing
Museums in Shanghai
Biographical museums in China
Literary museums in China
Monuments and memorials in China